The Black Pirate is a 1926 American silent action adventure film shot entirely in two-color Technicolor about an adventurer and a "company" of pirates. Directed by Albert Parker, it stars Douglas Fairbanks, Donald Crisp, Sam De Grasse, and Billie Dove. In 1993, The Black Pirate was included in the annual selection of 25 motion pictures to be added to the National Film Registry of the Library of Congress, being deemed "culturally, historically, or aesthetically significant."

Plot
The film begins with the looting of a ship already captured and badly mauled, by the pirates. After relieving the ship and crew of valuables, the pirates fire the ship, blowing up the gunpowder on board, sinking her. While the pirates celebrate, two survivors wash up on an island, an old man and his son. Before dying, the older man gives his signet ring to his son (Douglas Fairbanks). His son buries him, vowing vengeance.

The Pirate Captain and Lieutenant bring some crew to the other side of the same island to bury some of their plunder. They  then plan to murder the other pirates: "Dead men tell no tales." But first, the son appears as the "Black Pirate", who offers to join their company and fight their best man to prove his worth. After much fighting, the Black Pirate kills the Pirate Captain. The Pirate Lieutenant sneers, and says there is more to being a pirate than sword tricks. To further prove his worth, the Black Pirate says he will capture the next ship of prey single-handed, which he does. He then uses his wits to prevent the pirates from blowing up the ship along with the crew and passengers, suggesting that they hold the ship for ransom.

When a woman is discovered on board, the Pirate Lieutenant claims her. Being in love at first sight for her, the Black Pirate finds a way to temporarily save her from this fate by presenting her as a "princess" and urging the crew to use her as a hostage to ensure their ransom will be paid, as long as she remains "spotless and unharmed".

The pirates cheer the Black Pirate, and want to name him captain. The Pirate Lieutenant jeers but consents to wait to see if the ransom is paid by noon the next day. However, he secretly has a confederate destroy the ransom ship later that night to ensure it will not return.  Then, when the Black Pirate is caught trying to release the woman, the Pirate Lieutenant exposes him as a traitor and the pirates force him to walk the plank.

At noon the next day, with the ransom ship having failed to show, the Pirate Lieutenant goes to the woman to claim his prize. But just then, the Black Pirate, who with the help of the sympathetic one-armed pirate MacTavish, had survived being sent overboard, returns leading troops to stop the pirates. After a long fight, the pirates are routed. In the end, the Black Pirate is revealed to be a Duke, and the "Princess" he loves a noble Lady. Even MacTavish is moved to tears of joy by the happy ending.

Cast

Production notes
Donald Crisp (MacTavish) had directed Fairbanks' Don Q, Son of Zorro (1925) in addition to  playing the villain in that film. Crisp, who had been in films for over a decade at this point, was also a major director of silent films. He continued as a character actor for another forty years, winning the Academy Award for Best Supporting Actor in 1942 (How Green Was My Valley).

The script was adapted by Jack Cunningham from a story by Fairbanks, who used his middle names "Elton Thomas" as a pseudonym.  The film was directed by Albert Parker.

Fairbanks had conceived of the film as early as 1920 or 1921, after finishing The Mark of Zorro. He was allegedly inspired to produce the film after a conversation with Jackie Coogan. Off-hand, Coogan had mentioned how much he loved the Book of Pirates by Howard Pyle. Fairbanks and his art director, Carl Oscar Borg, sought to replicate Pyle's evocative illustrations in the film.

Fairbanks' wife Mary Pickford doubled for Dove for the kiss between the Princess and Black Pirate at the end of the film.

Technicolor
The Black Pirate was the third feature to be filmed in an early two-tone Technicolor process that had been first introduced in the 1922 feature The Toll of the Sea. This reproduces a limited but pleasing range of colors. Ben-Hur — filmed around the same time — contains two-tone sequences but is shot primarily in black-and-white with tinting and toning in many scenes.

Fairbanks spent considerable money on color tests before making Pirate. Two-tone Technicolor at that time required two strips of 35mm film to be fused together back-to-back to create the two-tone palette. Due to the heat of the projector, there would be so-called cupping of the film, making it difficult to keep the film in focus during projection. (Technicolor later perfected its process, so that two-color films required only a single strip of film.) A limitation of the process was that hues on film shot indoors under artificial light differed from that shot outdoors in sunlight, so two sets of costumes with slightly different colors for each character were required to get matching colors in the final film.

Legacy

Fairbanks biographer Jeffrey Vance maintains that “The Black Pirate was the most carefully prepared and controlled work of Fairbanks’s entire career” and “the most important feature-length silent film designed entirely for color cinematography.” Vance believes the limitations imposed by early Technicolor forced him to remove the "pageantry and visual effects" of his earlier swashbuckler and produce a straightforward action adventure. "The result was a refreshing return to form and a dazzling new showcase for the actor-producer’s favorite production value: himself. Fairbanks is resplendent as the bold buccaneer and buoyed by a production brimming with rip-roaring adventure and spiced with exceptional stunts and swordplay, including the celebrated ‘sliding down the sails’ sequence, arguably the most famous set piece of the entire Fairbanks treasure chest.”

A two-year-long restoration of The Black Pirate was begun in 1970 by the British National Film Archive at the request of Douglas Fairbanks Jr. One original release print and two incomplete negatives were used to restore the film. In addition to the surviving color film, some black and white outtakes and test footage have been found and included in the Blu-ray release of the film, with narration by Rudy Behlmer.

The film was selected for preservation in the United States National Film Registry in 1993.

The film is recognized by American Film Institute in these lists:
 2001: AFI's 100 Years...100 Thrills – Nominated
 2003: AFI's 100 Years...100 Heroes & Villains:
 “The Black Pirate” – Nominated Hero

In popular culture
The sail-sliding scene was replicated in other pirate-themed media, including Against All Flags, Rage of the Buccaneers, The Goonies and the Teenage Mutant Ninja Turtles IDW comic Turtles in Time #3 (August 2014).
The Marx Bros 1935 movie A Night at the Opera ends with a scene of chaos during an operatic performance. Drops and flies appear as would-it-be painted sails of Fairbanks' pirate ship as Harpo swings on ropes between them, ultimately descending down one, legs astride a splitting scene-painted canvas - a full sail-slide descent.
It was also subjected to a test by MythBusters, where the stunt was declared implausible ("busted").

References

Further reading
Goessel, Tracey. The First King of Hollywood: The Life of Douglas Fairbanks. Chicago Review Press (October 1, 2015) 
Vance, Jeffrey. Douglas Fairbanks. Berkeley, CA: University of California Press, 2008. .

External links

The Black Pirate essay by Tracey Goessel from the National Film Registry
The Black Pirate A Silent Film Review at moviessilently.com

Stills at silentfilmstillarchive.com
The Black Pirate Mary Pickford Technical Test No. 2 (color test film) at www.eastman.org
 (Billie Dove test starts at 0:44)

1926 films
1920s action adventure films
1920s color films
American silent feature films
American action adventure films
Silent films in color
American swashbuckler films
Pirate films
United Artists films
Films directed by Albert Parker
United States National Film Registry films
Fictional pirates
Early color films
1920s American films
Silent action adventure films